

Plesiosaurs

New taxa

Synapsids

Non-mammalian

References

1830s in paleontology
Paleontology